William Aniskovich (born April 8, 1963) is an American politician who served in the Connecticut Senate from the 12th district from 1991 to 2005. He ran unopposed in 1996.

References

External links
Project Vote Smart – Senator William Aniskovich (CT) profile
Our Campaigns – Senator William Aniskovich (CT) profile
Profile at Brenner, Saltzman & Wallman LLP

1963 births
Living people
Republican Party Connecticut state senators
20th-century American politicians
21st-century American politicians
Politicians from New Haven, Connecticut